European U23 records in the sport of athletics are ratified by the European Athletics Association (EAA). Athletics records comprise the best performance of an athlete before the year of their 23rd birthday. Technically, in all under-23 age divisions, the age is calculated "on December 31 of the year of competition" to avoid age group switching during a competitive season. EAA maintains an official list for such performances, but only in a specific list of outdoor events. All other records, including all indoor records, shown on this list are tracked by statisticians not officially sanctioned by the european governing body.

Outdoor

Men

Women

Indoor

Men

Women

Notes

References
General
European U23 Records 6 August 2022 updated
Specific

under-23
European